Świękity is a village in the administrative district of Gmina Lubomino, within Lidzbark County, Warmian-Masurian Voivodeship, in northern Poland. It is located 2 kilometers north of Ełdyty Wielkie.

References

Villages in Lidzbark County